Sergei Artyomevich Agababov (25 October 1926, in Makhachkala, Dagestan – 23 October 1959, in Vnukovo International Airport, Moscow, USSR) was a Soviet composer of Armenian origin.

Biography
Agababov was born on 25 October 1926 in Makhachkala. In 1951, he graduated with honours from both Dagestan Medical Institute, and the School of Music, in which he wrote his first song, Daughter of Dagestan and Song of Oilers. Having made his choice in favour of music, he entered the Moscow Conservatoire in 1952 in the composition class of Anatoly Alexandrov.

Death
On October 23, 1959, 2 days before his 33rd birthday, Agababov boarded the flight N200, an Ilyushin Il-14 flying from Baku to Moscow with stops in Makhachkala, Astrakhan and Stalingrad. Weather delayed the flight from the start. The flight arrived at Stalingrad with a delay of more than two hours. At 14:20 the aircraft approached Vnukovo, but the airport was closed due to meteorological conditions. Two hours after take-off, it arrived back in Stalingrad. At 18:50 the crew, being on duty for almost 14 hours, made a second takeoff. At 22:10 on the approach to the Vnukovo airport in low cloud cover when trying to land the plane, it touched trees 700 meters from the runway, fell to the forest, and was burned and destroyed. Only one person on board survived the crash, a passenger. All 5 crew members and the other 23 passengers, among whom was Sergei Artemyevitch Agababov, were killed.

Honours
Two schools of music and a street in Makhachkala have been named after Agababov, and, in 2010, a commemorative plaque was unveiled on the house in Buinakskaya Street where he was born and grew up.

References

1926 births
1959 deaths
Victims of aviation accidents or incidents in the Soviet Union
People from Makhachkala
Soviet composers
Victims of aviation accidents or incidents in 1959